Andrea Rossi may refer to:

 Andrea Rossi (economist), Policy Fellow and Program Director at Harvard University and United Nations Officer
 Andrea Rossi (footballer) (born 1986), Italian football (soccer) defender
 Andrea Rossi (entrepreneur) (born 1950), Italian businessman and inventor
 Andrea Rossi (sport shooter) (born 1991), Swiss sport shooter

See also
 Andrea de Rossi (born 1972), Italian rugby coach and former rugby union footballer
 Andrea de Rossi (archbishop) (1644–1696)